Tonshalovo is a rural locality (a settlement) in Tonshalovskoye Rural Settlement, Cherepovetsky District, Vologda Oblast, Russia. The population was 4,102 as of 2002. There are 11 streets.

Geography 
Tonshalovo is located 9 km northeast of Cherepovets (the district's administrative centre) by road. Gorka is the nearest rural locality.

References 

Rural localities in Cherepovetsky District